Cyclophora coecaria is a moth in the  family Geometridae. It is found in Venezuela and Mexico.

References

Moths described in 1870
Cyclophora (moth)
Moths of Central America
Moths of South America